Sergey Mikhailovich Orlov (1911–1971) was a Soviet painter, ceramicist and sculptor specializing in depicting Russian historical figures.

Orlov worked in ceramics and porcelain for decades until his first large-scale commission, the 1954 equestrian statue of Yuri Dolgorukiy on Tverskaya Street, which he won by competition.  Other work includes the 1955 monument to Russian explorer Afanasy Nikitin in his medieval home of Tver, a group called "Belorussian Partisan" in a passage in the Belorusskaya (Koltsevaya Line) station of the Moscow Metro, and work on the Main Gate of the All-Russia Exhibition Centre.

Sources

External links
 Photo of Orlov working on the Nikitin monument

1911 births
1971 deaths
Russian male sculptors
Soviet sculptors
20th-century sculptors
Stalin Prize winners
Artists from Saint Petersburg